Lygosoma schneideri, also known commonly as Schneider's writhing skink and  the Sumatran supple skink, is a species of lizard in the family Scincidae. The species is endemic to Indonesia.

Etymology
The specific name, schneideri, is in honor of Gustav Schneider, Jr., who collected the holotype.

Geographic range
L. schneideri is found on the island of Sumatra in western Indonesia.

Description

References

Further reading
Grismer LL, Quah ESH, Duzulkafly Z, Yambun P (2018). "On the taxonomy of Lygosoma banfyldei Bartlett, 1895 (Squamata: Scincidae) with descriptions of new species from Borneo and Peninsular Malaysia and the resurrection of Lygosoma schneideri Werner, 1900". Zootaxa 4438 (3): 528–550.
Werner F (1900). "Reptilien und Batrachier aus Sumatra, gesammelt von Herrn Gustav Schneider jr. im Jahre 1897–98 ". Zoologische Jahrbücher. Abtheilung für Systematik, Geographie und Biologie der Thiere 13 (6): 479–508 + Plates 31–35. (Lygosoma schneideri, new species, pp. 487–488 + Plate 31, figure 1). (in German).

Lygosoma
Reptiles described in 1900
Reptiles of Indonesia
Endemic fauna of Indonesia
Taxa named by Franz Werner
Fauna of Sumatra